Rufus River, a watercourse of the Murray catchment and part of the Murray–Darling basin, is located in south western New South Wales, Australia.

The river leaves Lake Victoria, flowing generally west and then south-west, before reaching its confluence with the Murray River, at Lock 7, near Rufus.

Rufus River was visited by European explorer, Charles Sturt, in 1830, and named after his red-haired (or rufus) travelling companion, George Macleay.

A number of conflicts between European and Aboriginal people in 1841 led to the Rufus River massacre.

See also

 Rivers of New South Wales
 List of rivers of Australia

References

External links
Map of Rufus River – Bonzle Digital Atlas of Australia

Rivers of New South Wales
Murray-Darling basin
Rivers in the Riverina